Rúben Daniel Fonseca Macedo (born 9 March 1996) is a Portuguese professional footballer who plays for C.D. Nacional as a winger.

Club career

Porto
Born in Amarante, Porto District of Swiss descent, Macedo joined FC Porto's academy at the age of 11. On 1 February 2015, still a junior, he made his professional debut with the B side, coming on as a late substitute for Frédéric Maciel in a 4–0 home win against S.C. Covilhã in the Segunda Liga. On 3 October of the same year, the week after finding the net against Chelsea for the UEFA Youth League (3–3 group stage home draw), he scored his first league goal, helping the visitors defeat S.C. Olhanense 2–0.

Macedo contributed 34 matches (14 starts) and four goals in the 2015–16 season, as his team became the first reserve one to win the second division championship. On 3 January 2018 he was loaned to fellow league club Varzim SC, reuniting with his former coach Capucho.

On 12 June 2018, Macedo renewed his contract with Porto until 2020. In December, he went on loan to G.D. Chaves of the Primeira Liga. His maiden appearance in the competition took place on 13 January 2019, when he started the 2–1 victory over C.D. Tondela.

Aves
Deemed surplus to requirements by manager Sérgio Conceição, Macedo left the Estádio do Dragão and signed a three-year contract with C.D. Aves on 4 July 2019. He scored his only goal for the bottom-placed team on 18 August, in the 3–1 home defeat of C.S. Marítimo.

Marítimo
On 18 August 2020, Macedo joined Marítimo on a two-year deal. The following 22 February, he gave away an injury-time penalty against his former club Porto – who won 2–1 as a result of that action, after Otávio converted it– being subsequently subjected to abuse on his social media.

References

External links

1996 births
Living people
People from Amarante, Portugal
Portuguese people of Swiss descent
Sportspeople from Porto District
Portuguese footballers
Association football wingers
Primeira Liga players
Liga Portugal 2 players
Campeonato de Portugal (league) players
Padroense F.C. players
FC Porto B players
Varzim S.C. players
G.D. Chaves players
C.D. Aves players
C.S. Marítimo players
C.D. Nacional players
Portugal youth international footballers